Ebli-ye Sofla (also Romanized as Eblī-ye Soflá and Ebellī Soflá; also known as Ablī-ye Pā’īn, Ebellī, and Eblī-ye Pa'īn) is a village in Sanjabad-e Gharbi Rural District, in the Central District of Kowsar County, Ardabil Province, Iran. At the 2006 census, its population was 132, in 27 families.

References 

Tageo

Towns and villages in Kowsar County